RTD Bus and Rail (branded as TheRide) is a transit system in the Denver, Colorado, metropolitan area. Operated by the Regional Transportation District (RTD), it currently runs 86 local, 23 regional, 14 limited, and 3 skyRide bus routes plus some special services.

History

Bus
Bus service in Denver dates back to 1924, when Denver Tramway began the first bus between Englewood and Fort Logan. Buses had completely replaced the previously expansive streetcar system in metro Denver by 1950. However, cars were becoming a larger part of life, and ridership was declining. From 1969 to 1971, Denver Tramway required the sponsorship of the City and County of Denver to continue service. In 1971 with aging equipment, low revenues and lackluster ridership, the Denver Tramway Company transferred all of its assets to city-owned Denver Metro Transit.

In 1969, the Regional Transportation District (RTD) was created in the 47th session of the Colorado General Assembly to provide public transportation to five additional counties in the metropolitan area. It acquired privately owned companies, improved service frequency, and expanded to routes that commercial carriers previously operated such as airport buses.

In July 1974, Denver Metro Transit became part of RTD, and under the new banner, ridership began to increase.

Light rail
RTD's first light rail line, a  section of what is now the D Line and L Line, opened on Friday, October 7, 1994. It operated with free service for that half day and the first weekend, with revenue service starting on October 10.  It was estimated that more than 200,000 passengers rode the new system during its two-and-a-half-day opening weekend, when the fleet comprised only 11 Siemens SD-100 rail cars.

Since that time, several additional light rail lines have been opened. An additional  Southeast Corridor extension along I-25 to Lone Tree and a branch along I-225 to Parker Road were completed in November 2006 as part of Denver's T-REX project.

As of April 2013, the system had 170 light rail vehicles, serving  of track.

Commuter rail
With the passage of FasTracks, RTD began planning for a series of commuter rail lines. The first  of which, the A Line servicing Denver International Airport, opened on April 22, 2016.

As one of the first new commuter rail systems in the country planned after enactment of the Rail Safety Improvement Act of 2008, positive Train Control (PTC) and vehicle monitoring system technologies are implemented along the system's commuter train lines. After the A Line opened between Denver Union Station and Denver International Airport, it experienced a series of issues related to having to adjust the length of unpowered gaps between different overhead power sections, direct lightning strikes, snagging wires, and crossing signals behaving unexpectedly. In response to the crossing issues, Denver Transit Partners, the contractor building and operating the A Line, stationed crossing guards at each place where the A line crosses local streets at grade while it continues to explore software revisions and other fixes to address the underlying issues. The FRA is requiring frequent progress reports, but allowed RTD to open its B Line as originally scheduled on July 25, 2016, because the B Line only has one at-grade crossing along its current route that is not designated to be a quiet zone. However, FRA previously halted testing on the longer G Line to Wheat Ridge – originally scheduled to open in late 2016 – until more progress could be shown resolving the A Line crossing issues. On April 26, 2019, the G Line opened to the public.

Accidents and incidents 
On January 28, 2019, an R Line light rail train derailed the junction of East Exposition Avenue and South Sable Boulevard (between Aurora Metro Center and Florida stations) due to excessive speed. One woman's foot was amputated by the train wheels after she was ejected from the car during the accident, eight other passengers were also injured. Although determined responsible for the accident, no charges were filed against the driver.

On September 21, 2022, another derailment occurred at the same location. Three people were taken to hospital with injuries that were not believed to be life threatening. Video showed the train approaching the turn at high speed, although  no cause has been officially released.

Current services

Primary services 
The primary RTD services are scheduled bus and rail routes. 

Most bus routes are divided into Local and Regional service levels. 

Rail services are divided in four fare zones: A, B, C and airport. Local service is travel within two consecutive lettered zones, and regional service is within all three lettered zones. The airport zone applies for bus or rail travel into and out of Denver International Airport.

Rail services 
The current commuter rail lines are:
 A Line: Union Station – Denver International Airport
 B Line: Union Station – Westminster
 G Line: Union Station – Wheat Ridge/Ward
 N Line: Union Station – Eastlake/124th

The current light rail lines are:
 D Line: Downtown Denver (18th/California & Stout) – Littleton/Mineral
 E Line: Union Station – RidgeGate
 H Line: Downtown Denver (18th/California & Stout) – Florida
 L Line: Downtown Denver (16th/California & Stout) – 30th/Downing
 R Line: Peoria – RidgeGate (currently suspended south of Lincoln)
 W Line: Union Station – Jefferson County Government Center–Golden

With the opening of the Southeast Corridor, many regional bus routes that provided service from the North Metro to Denver Tech Center were replaced by service to Union Station and light rail from Union Station to the Belleview light rail station.  Several regional bus routes to and from the South Metro were also eliminated by the openings of the Southeast & Southwest Corridors, replaced by feeder routes to light rail.

Special services 
Special bus services are offered for various purposes.

 Access-a-Ride: Paratransit service providing local bus transportation in the Denver metro area for people with disabilities and cannot access the fixed-route bus and train system
 FlexRide: On-demand shuttle service connecting less densely populated areas without fixed-route bus and rail service to nearby transportation hubs

 Flatiron Flyer: Express bus service between Boulder and various locations in Denver
 Free MallRide: A free shuttle bus service that runs the length of the 16th Street Mall, connecting three major RTD transportation hubs (Union Station, California/Stout station, and Civic Center Station)
 Free MetroRide: A free shuttle bus service that runs parallel to the MallRide on 18th and 19th Streets, but operates faster by making fewer stops between Union Station and Civic Center Station
 SeniorRide: Point-to-point shuttles for groups of 10 or more seniors, and scheduled service between shopping centers and senior housing complexes/community centers
 SkyRide: Airport shuttle/express bus service for travelers heading to Denver International Airport
 Sporting events service:
 "BroncosRide", which provides direct service to Broncos Stadium at Mile High from various locations around the metro area.
 "RunRide", a similar service which provides direct service to Boulder during the Bolder Boulder 10K road race.

Stations

Bus stations 
Major bus stations provide termini for express and regional routes.  Many local and limited routes stop near these stations, making transfers between routes relatively easy. Of the three major bus stations in the RTD system, only one—Union Station—is also served directly by light rail trains.  None of the three major bus stations is a Park 'n' Ride facility. Civic Center Station is connected to Union Station via the Free MallRide and Free MetroRide shuttle services.

Rail stations 

Many of the Light Rail and Commuter Rail stations have gates for various bus services.  As of 2018, there are 55 stations on the eight lines in the RTD Rail system. RTD has adopted specific design standards that are incorporated into its station design, with a specific emphasis on the platform, its transition plaza and the multi-modal access provided at the facility. Platforms are designed to accommodate four or three car Light Rail trains in addition to two car or four car Commuter Rail trains and may be in either a side, island or side center style. The transition plaza is the area where tickets are purchased and passenger services can be found. Additionally, all stations include works of public art as part of RTD's art-n-Transit program. These works include independent works or as pieces incorporated into the canopies, columns, pavers, windscreens, fencing and landscaping present at all stations.

Park-n-Rides 
A number of rail stations in the RTD system, as well as a number of bus stops located away from the three major bus stations, are attached to dedicated RTD parking facilities.  These are the Park-n-Ride locations.  As of 2014, there are more than 70 RTD Park-n-Ride facilities with an aggregate total of more than 30,000 parking spaces.

Future services 
Extensions to the Southwest Light Rail Corridor, the L Light Rail Line, and the B and N Commuter Rail lines are planned via the FasTracks project.

Art on the light rail system 
In 1977, Colorado passed the Art in Public Places bill which required that 1 percent of all state-funded construction budgets be used to purchase art. About $1 million from the T-REX contingency budget was dedicated to art projects at each of the 13 new southeast corridor light rail stations as part of RTD's art-n-Transit program.

 Ira Sherman, "Stange Machine," Louisiana/Pearl Station 
 Ries Niemi, "Big Boots," Colorado Station 
 John Goe, "Reflective Discourse," University Station 
 Gregory Gove, "Connected," Yale Station 
 Chris Janney, "Harmonic Pass: Denver," Southmoor Station 
 Richard Elliott, "Thunder Over the Rockies," Belleview Station 
 Christopher Weed, "Windswept,"  Dayton Station 
 Dwight Atkinson, "Yet Another Way To Know That Nature Will Eventually Win," Nine Mile Station 
 Wopo Holup, "Orchard Memory," Orchard Station 
 Michael Clapper, "Nucleus," Arapahoe at Village Center Station 
 John McEnroe, "Fools Gold," Dry Creek Station 
 Emmett Culligan, "Plow," County Line Station 
 Ray King, "Sun Stream," Lincoln Station 

Design team artists who worked on windscreen benches, railings, bike racks and canopy columns at all stations were Susan Cooper and Rafe Ropek.

References

External links
 

Bus transportation in Colorado
 
25 kV AC railway electrification
750 V DC railway electrification
1969 establishments in Colorado
Colorado railroads